Lahey is a surname. Notable people with this surname include:

Alex Lahey (born 1992), Australian musician
Benjamin Lahey, American psychologist
Frank Lahey (1880–1953), American physician
John C. Lahey, American architect
John L. Lahey (born 1946), president of Quinnipiac University
Lyle Lahey (1931–2013), American political cartoonist
May Darlington Lahey (1889–1984), Australian-American lawyer and judge
Raymond Lahey (born 1940), Canadian Catholic bishop
Romeo Lahey (1887–1968), Australian businessman
Tim Lahey (born 1982), American baseball player
Vida Lahey (1882–1968), Australian artist
Nathaniel "Nate" Lahey, fictional character played by Billy Brown (List of How to Get Away with Murder characters)
Isaac Lahey, fictional character played by Daniel Sharman (List of Teen Wolf secondary characters)

See also
Lahey Health, a health service organization in Massachusetts
Lahey Hospital & Medical Center, a teaching hospital of Tufts University School of Medicine